Rhododendron alutaceum is a species of flowering plant in the family Ericaceae. The flowers are white to pink, with crimson spots and purplish-red basal blotch.

Varieties
 R. alutaceum var. alutaceum
 R. alutaceum var. iodes (Balf. f. & Forrest) D.F. Chamb.
 R. alutaceum var. russotinctum (Balf. f. & Forrest) D.F. Chamb.

References

Sources
 "Rhododendron alutaceum", I. B. Balfour & W. W. Smith, Notes Roy. Bot. Gard. Edinburgh. 10: 81. 1917.
 The Plant List
 Flora of China
 Hirsutum.com

alutaceum
Plants described in 1917
Taxa named by Isaac Bayley Balfour
Taxa named by William Wright Smith